The Combat Aviation Brigade, 35th Infantry Division

Shoulder sleeve insignia
The division's shoulder patch, a white Santa Fe cross on a blue disc with a green border, was originally approved for the 35th Division on 29 October 1918.

History
The Combat Aviation Brigade, 35th Infantry Division was constituted in October 1988 as the 635th Aviation Group by authority ofm the National Guard Bureau. Between April and August 1989, the unit assumed command and control of 3rd Battalion, 135th Aviation Regiment, 205th Medical Battalion, and 1st Battalion, 135th Aviation. The unit was officially activated as a component of the Missouri Army National Guard on 16 September 1989. The 635th Aviation Group was inactivated on 8 August 1993 at Jefferson City Army Aviation Support Facility.

On 24 March 1997, the unit was reorganized and federally recognized as HHC Aviation Brigade, 35th Infantry Division in Warrensburg, Missouri. In 2003, the unit moved to Sedalia, Missouri, and was redesignated the 20th Aviation Brigade (Theater). The unit moved into a new facility at the Missouri State Fairgrounds in Sedalia around October 2005. On 2 January 2009, the unit was redesignated as HHC, Combat Aviation Brigade, 35th Infantry Division, although it is commonly referred to simply as the "35th CAB."

The CAB, 35th Infantry Division concluded a nine-month deployment rotation to Kuwait in support of Operation Spartan Shield and Operation Enduring Freedom on April 18, 2013.

The CAB was deployed in support of Operation Inherent Resolve and Operation Spartan Shield in 2018–2019.
Attached units were:

 1st Battalion (Attack Reconnaissance), 4th Aviation Regiment (Fort Riley)
 4th Battalion (Attack Reconnaissance), 4th Aviation Regiment (Fort Carson)
 1st Battalion (Assault Helicopter), 108th Aviation Regiment (Kansas National Guard)
 2d Battalion (General Support), 211th Aviation Regiment (Utah National Guard)
 Company D, 10th Aviation Regiment, CAB, 10th Mountain Division (Fort Drum)
 Company F, 1st Battalion, 227th Aviation Regiment, CAB, 1st Cavalry Division (Fort Hood)
 935th Aviation Support Battalion (Missouri National Guard)

Soldiers are from 14 states' National Guard: Wyoming, Alabama, Arkansas, Connecticut, Georgia, Hawaii, Illinois, Kansas, Louisiana, Minnesota, Missouri, South Dakota, Texas, Utah, and Vermont.

Organization
The current configuration is as follows:
 1st Battalion, 106th Aviation Regiment, Fort Leonard Wood
 Detachment 1, Company D, 1st Battalion, 106th Aviation Regiment, Fort Leonard Wood
 Detachment 1, Company E, 1st Battalion, 106th Aviation Regiment, Fort Leonard Wood
Company B, 1st Battalion, 134th Aviation Regiment, Jefferson City, Missouri
 1st Battalion, 135th Aviation Regiment, Whiteman Air Force Base
 3rd Battalion, 135th Aviation Regiment, Lebanon, Missouri
 Detachment 3, Company I, 185th Aviation Regiment, (C23) Springfield, Missouri
Detachment 40, Operations Support Airlift Command (OSACOM), Jefferson City
 935th Aviation Support Battalion (935th ASB), Springfield
Company A, Aurora, Missouri
Detachment 3, Company B, Warrensburg, Missouri
Company C, Warrensburg, Missouri
 Company C, 1st Battalion, 108th Aviation Regiment

References

Aviation Brigades of the United States Army
CAB035
Military units and formations established in 1997